The 1955 Ulster Grand Prix was the seventh round of the 1955 Grand Prix motorcycle racing season. It took place on 11–13 August 1955 at the Dundrod Circuit.

500 cc classification

350 cc classification

250 cc classification

References

Ulster Grand Prix
Ulster
Ulster
Ulster Grand Prix
Ulster Grand Prix